The 2005 African U-17 Championship was a football competition organized by the Confederation of African Football (CAF). The tournament took place in Gambia. The top three teams qualified for the 2005 FIFA U-17 World Championship.

Qualification

Qualified teams

 (host nation)

Group stage

Group A